Elysius phantasma is a moth of the family Erebidae. It was described by William Schaus in 1905. It is found in French Guiana and Suriname.

References

phantasma
Moths of South America
Moths described in 1905